North Ludlow Beamish (31 December 1797 – 27 April 1872), was an Irish military writer and antiquary.

He was the son of William Beamish, Esq., of Beaumont House, County Cork.

In November 1816 he obtained a commission in the 4th Royal Irish Dragoon Guards, in which corps he purchased a troop in 1823. In 1825 he published an English translation of a small cavalry manual written by Count Friedrich Wilhelm von Bismarck, a distinguished officer then engaged in the reorganisation of the Württemberg cavalry. Beamish's professional abilities brought him to notice, and he received a half-pay majority in the following year. Whilst attached to the vice-regal suite in Hanover he subsequently published a translation of Count von Bismarck's Lectures on Cavalry, with original notes, in which he suggested various changes soon after adopted in the British cavalry. He also completed and edited a history of the King's German Legion from its formation in the British service in 1803 to its disbandment in 1816, which was published in England in 1834-7, and is a model of military compilations of its class.

After quitting Hanover Beamish devoted much attention to Norse antiquities, and in 1841 published a summary of the researches of Professor Carl Christian Rafn, relative to the discovery of America by the Northmen in the tenth century. Although the fact had been notified as early as 1828 (in a letter in Niles' Register, Boston, U.S.), it was very little known. Beamish's modest volume not only popularised the discovery by epitomising the principal details in Rafn's great work Antiquitates Americanæ (Copenhagen, 1837), but it contains, in the shape of translations from the Sagas, one of the best summaries of Icelandic historical literature anywhere to be found within an equal space. Beamish, like his younger brother, Richard, who was at one time in the Grenadier guards, was a Fellow of the Royal Society and an associate of various learned bodies.

He died at Annmount, County Cork, on 27 April 1872.

Works
Instructions for the Field Service of Cavalry, from the German of Count von Bismarck, London, 1825, 12mo.
Lectures on the Duties of Cavalry, from the German of Count von Bismarck, London, 1827, 8vo.
History of the King's German Legion 2 vols. London, 1834-7, 8vo.
The Discovery of America by the Northmen in the Tenth Century, with Notes on the Early Settlement of the Irish in the Western Hemisphere, London, 1841, 8vo; a reprint of this work, edited by the Rev. E. F. Slafter, A.M., was published by the Prince Society of Albany, N.Y., in 1877.
On the Alterations of Level in the Baltic, British Association Reports, 1843.
Major Ludlow Beamish's visit to the Kilkerrin Estate of the Irish Waste Land Company, Dublin, c. 1844.
On the Uses and Application of Cavalry in War, London, 1855, 8vo.

See also
 North L.A Beamish (son)

References

The following references are cited in the DNB but have not been independently verified
Burke's Landed Gentry
Army Lists
Publications of the Prince Society, Albany, N.Y.
Beamish 's Works

1797 births
1872 deaths
Fellows of the Royal Society
Irish antiquarians
British military writers